Hanging Rock, also known as Overhanging Rock, or locally as Drummond's head, is a historic natural feature located in Gulph Mills, Upper Merion Township, Montgomery County, Pennsylvania. It is a large natural outcropping of phyllite that protrudes approximately eight feet over the roadway.  The roadway, Pennsylvania Route 320 (S Gulph Road), was laid out as a public highway in 1711–1712.  The road was traveled by General George Washington and the Continental Army into Valley Forge for the winter encampment of 1777–1778.  The rock was dedicated as a memorial to that march by the Valley Forge Historical Society in 1924. In 1917 and 1954 holes were drilled into Hanging Rock for dynamite in an effort to remove the rock. This, along with erosion and vehicle collisions, has changed the shape of the rock over time. The "overhang" of the rock has decreased since the invention of the automobile as car crashes have chipped away at the rock over the years.In January 2020, PennDot started a project to realign Route 320 (South Gulph Road) away from Hanging Rock, which had protruded into the roadway resulting in limited sight distances; the project was completed in June 2022.

It was listed on the National Register of Historic Places in 1997.

References 

National Register of Historic Places in Pennsylvania
Geography of Montgomery County, Pennsylvania
National Register of Historic Places in Montgomery County, Pennsylvania
Natural features on the National Register of Historic Places
Upper Merion Township, Montgomery County, Pennsylvania